Ilm-Kreis I is an electoral constituency (German: Wahlkreis) represented in the Landtag of Thuringia. It elects one member via first-past-the-post voting. Under the current constituency numbering system, it is designated as constituency 22. It covers the southern part of Ilm-Kreis.

Ilm-Kreis I was created for the 1994 state election. Since 2014, it has been represented by Andreas Bühl of the Christian Democratic Union (CDU).

Geography
As of the 2019 state election, Ilm-Kreis I covers the southern part of Ilm-Kreis, specifically the municipalities of Angelroda, Elgersburg, Geratal (only Geraberg), Großbreitenbach, Ilmenau, Martinroda, and Plaue (only Neusiß). It also includes the village of Schmiedefeld am Rennsteig from Suhl.

Members
The constituency was held by the Christian Democratic Union from its creation in 1994 until 2009, during which time it was represented by Siegfried Jaschke. It was won by The Left in 2009, and represented by Petra Enders. The CDU's candidate Andreas Bühl won the constituency in 2014. He was re-elected in 2019.

Election results

2019 election

2014 election

2009 election

2004 election

1999 election

1994 election

References

Electoral districts in Thuringia
1994 establishments in Germany
Ilm-Kreis
Constituencies established in 1994